Duncan Peter Regehr  (born October 5, 1952) is a Canadian writer, multimedia artist, and film and television actor. He was also a figure skater and a classically trained Shakespearean stage actor in his native Canada, before heading to Hollywood in 1980. 

Regehr played the title character in Zorro, The Family Channel's television series based upon Johnston McCulley's classic hero. He also had roles in multiple television incarnations of Star Trek.

Early life
Regehr was born in Lethbridge, Alberta, and raised in Victoria, British Columbia, Canada. His mother, Dorothy Mary (née Mulkern), was UK-born and his father, Peter Regehr, was a Russian artist. He was active in broadcasting at age 14, when he was host of a teenager-oriented talk show on the Canadian Broadcasting Corporation (CBC). As a high school student, he figure-skated in ice shows. He received early acting instruction at the Bastion Theater School in Victoria.

Career
After numerous appearances in Canadian theatre, television (e.g., in the family TV show Matt and Jenny on the Wilderness Trail), and notable roles on radio for the CBC, he and his wife, Catherine, moved to Los Angeles, California, where he began to develop his work in film. Shortly after arriving, he was hired to play villain Prince Dirk Blackpool in the short-lived 1983 fantasy-comedy series Wizards and Warriors opposite Jeff Conaway's Prince Erik Greystone. He went on to star in many more US television films, including the 1984 television mini-series The Last Days of Pompeii, as Lydon, the gladiator; as Errol Flynn in the 1985 CBS film My Wicked, Wicked Ways, based on the autobiography of Flynn; and on the science fiction series V as the Visitor military leader Charles. He also starred in the 1982 mini-series The Blue and the Gray as Captain Randolph. In 1987, Regehr portrayed a dynamite-slinging Count Dracula in the film The Monster Squad.

One of Regehr's best-known roles to date was in Zorro as Don Diego De La Vega and his alter ego, the swashbuckling hero, Zorro. Regehr portrayed the masked hero for 88 episodes on The Family Channel from 1990 to 1993.

Regehr has also made numerous TV guest appearances.  He was a guest actor on Cybill, Murder, She Wrote, Hotel and the seventh-season Star Trek: The Next Generation episode "Sub Rosa" as Ronin, a ghost who falls in love with Beverly Crusher. He also appeared in Star Trek: Deep Space Nine as Shakaar Edon.

Regehr has been painting and drawing since childhood. Regehr first exhibited his artwork in 1974 at the Stratford Festival in Ontario. The following year, he showed at the Yorkville Art Center in Toronto. Since then, he has had numerous exhibitions in Canada, Europe, and the United States. His work is found in collections worldwide, including the Jilin Collection (China), The Kunsthallen (Copenhagen), Focus on the Masters Archives for the Getty Museum (USA), and the Syllavethy Collection of Scotland (GB).  Regehr's automonograph, The Dragon's Eye: An Artist's View, received international acclaim and was lauded by art critics and literary reviewers as a book of visual and poetic excellence. In 1996 he won the American Vision Award of Distinction in the Arts, and was granted the lifetime appellation 'Royal Canadian Artist' with honours in 2000 by the Royal Canadian Academy of Art for his outstanding artistic achievements.

On November 10, 2008, Regehr was awarded the honorary degree of Doctor of Fine Arts by the University of Victoria, in Victoria, British Columbia, Canada. Some of his art works are also displayed in art galleries in the region.

Personal life
Regehr lives and works out of studios in the United States and Canada. He has been married twice: first to Francine Wurster in 1974–1978 and second to Catherine Campion in 1979–2016.

Filmography

References

External links
 
 
 
 Duncan Regehr on display at Signatures Gallery

1952 births
Living people
Artists from Alberta
Sportspeople from Lethbridge
Canadian male film actors
Canadian male stage actors
Canadian male television actors
Members of the Royal Canadian Academy of Arts
Canadian people of Russian descent
Canadian people of English descent
Male actors from Alberta